Frits Helmuth (3 July 1931 – 12 December 2004) was a Danish film actor. He appeared in 60 films between 1938 and 2004. He was born and died in Copenhagen, Denmark. He was the son of Osvald Helmuth and is the father of Mikael Helmuth and Pusle Helmuth.

Selected filmography

 Blaavand melder storm (1938) - Jens Olesen som barn
 Ebberød Bank (1943) - Vipperups søn
 Frihed, lighed og Louise (1944) - Peter Kildal
 Hans store aften (1946) - Egon
 Ta' Pelle med (1952) - Arbejder på mejeriet
 My Son Peter (1953) - Peter
 The Son (1953) - Simon
 Kongeligt besøg (1954) - Erik
 Det er så yndigt at følges ad (1954) - Lasse
 Den kloge mand (1956) - Ulf Thomsen
 Ung leg (1956) - Benny
 Jeg elsker dig (1957) - David
 Styrmand Karlsen (1958) - Styrmand Knud Karlsen
 De sjove år (1959) - Jens Birk
 Skibet er ladet med (1960) - Max Ibsen
 Eventyrrejsen (1960) - Gustav Hollstrøm
 Duellen (1962) - Mikael
 Prinsesse for en dag (1962) - Teaterdirektør Jan Forsing
 Tine (1964) - Løjtnant Appel
 Halløj i himmelsengen (1965) - Pierre de Sauterne (voice, uncredited)
 A Farmer's Life (1965) - Frantz von Rambow
 Stormvarsel (1968) - Kurt Vinderup
 Løgneren (1970) - Johannes Vig
 Per (1975) - Helge Lorentzen
 Kun sandheden (1975) - Kriminalassistent Mørck
 Fru Inger til Østråt (1975) - Nils Lykke
 Lille spejl (1978) - Bent
 Hvem myrder hvem? (1978)
 Johnny Larsen (1979) - Johnnys father
 Skal vi danse først? (1979) - Susannes Dad
 Ulvetid (1981) - Tom
 Forræderne (1983) - Dr. Bachmann
 In the Middle of the Night (1984) - J.O. Kurtzen
 Waltzing Regitze (1989) - Karl Aage (Regitze's Husband)
 Høfeber (1991) - Dommeren
 Stolen Spring (1993) - Lektor Blomme
 Carl, My Childhood Symphony (1994) - Outzen
 1996: Pust på meg! (1997) - Bestefar
 A Place Nearby (2000) - Jespersen
 Flickering Lights (2000) - Carl
 Villa Paranoia (2004) - Walentin
 Oskar & Josefine (2005) - Doktor Dinesen

References

External links

1931 births
2004 deaths
Danish male film actors
Best Actor Bodil Award winners
Male actors from Copenhagen
Best Actor Robert Award winners